Bobby Etheridge (25 March 1934 – 4 March 1988) was an English footballer who played for Gloucester City, Bristol City and Cheltenham Town. A wing half, Etheridge made over 250 Football League appearances.

Career

Etheridge started his career at Gloucester City where he was the leading scorer in the 1954–55 season and helped Gloucester City to the Southern League Cup success in 1955–56. Pat Beasley signed Etheridge for Bristol City in September 1956 where he played 288 games and scored 47 goals  In July 1965 he left Bristol City for Cheltenham Town as player manager.

In his later career in November 1973 he returned to Gloucester City as manager where he remained until 1976. He was also caretaker manager in 1985. He ended his managerial career with local Gloucester team, Longlevens.

He also played cricket as a wicketkeeper and batsman for Gloucestershire between 1954 and 1961. He was generally the understudy to Barry Meyer who was the county first choice wicket keeper in this period. He played 33 matches for Gloucestershire scoring 796 runs with a batting average of 15.92; behind the stumps he achieved 33 catches and 8 stumpings.

References

1934 births
1988 deaths
Footballers from Gloucester
Cricketers from Gloucester
English footballers
Association football midfielders
Gloucester City A.F.C. players
Bristol City F.C. players
Cheltenham Town F.C. players
Southern Football League players
English Football League players
English football managers
Cheltenham Town F.C. managers
Gloucester City A.F.C. managers
Gloucestershire cricketers
English cricketers of 1946 to 1968